Hussain Ali Baba Mohamed (born 11 February 1982) is a former Bahraini footballer who last played for Al Riffa and the Bahrain national football team.

Career

Baba first played for Al Riffa football club from 2003 to 2004 after which he switched to Qatar's  Al-Shamal football club from 2004 till 2005. He then moved to Kuwait SC until 2007 when he joined Al-Rayyan football club, where he scored twice, until 2008. From 2008 to 2009, he joined and left three clubs; Umm-Salal in 2008, Al-Salmiya and Al-Shabab (UAE) clubs in 2009 respectively. In 2010, he joined Saudi Arabia's Al-Wehda club until 2011. Following this, he joined El Jaish for a single season until 2012. In 2012, he played for Kuwait SC.

International goals
Scores and results list Bahrain's goal tally first.

See also
 List of men's footballers with 100 or more international caps

References

External links
 
 Baba Sign For Kuwait SC

1982 births
Living people
Bahraini footballers
Bahraini expatriate footballers
Expatriate footballers in Qatar
Expatriate footballers in Kuwait
Bahraini expatriate sportspeople in the United Arab Emirates
Bahraini expatriate sportspeople in Qatar
Bahrain international footballers
Bahraini expatriate sportspeople in Kuwait
Al-Rayyan SC players
Umm Salal SC players
Al-Shamal SC players
al-Fateh SC players
Al-Wehda Club (Mecca) players
Al-Muharraq SC players
2007 AFC Asian Cup players
2011 AFC Asian Cup players
2015 AFC Asian Cup players
El Jaish SC players
Qatar Stars League players
Kuwait SC players
Al-Shabab FC (Riyadh) players
Al Shabab Al Arabi Club Dubai players
Association football central defenders
Sportspeople from Manama
FIFA Century Club
UAE Pro League players
Saudi Professional League players
Bahraini expatriate sportspeople in Saudi Arabia
Expatriate footballers in Saudi Arabia
AFC Cup winning players
2004 AFC Asian Cup players
Kuwait Premier League players
Al Salmiya SC players